Luigi Piavi, OFM (born on 17 March 1833 in Ravina, Italy - died on 24 January 1905 in Jerusalem, Ottoman Palestine) was a Latin Patriarch of Jerusalem.

Life

Luigi Piavi received his priestly ordination in 1855. Pope Pius IX appointed him in 1876 Apostolic Delegate to Syria and Apostolic Vicar of Aleppo. He received his episcopal ordination as Titular Archbishop of Siunia on 18 November 1876, and in 1889 Piavi was appointed  Patriarch of Jerusalem by Pope Leo XIII, the only Catholic Latin Patriarch in the East.

From 1889 until his death in 1905 he was Grand Master of the Equestrian Order of the Holy Sepulchre of Jerusalem.

References

External links
 http://www.catholic-hierarchy.org/bishop/bbiavi.html 

1833 births
1905 deaths
Latin Patriarchs of Jerusalem
20th-century Italian Roman Catholic bishops
19th-century Italian Roman Catholic bishops
Apostolic Nuncios to Syria
Grand Masters of the Order of the Holy Sepulchre